Van Vugt is a Dutch toponymic surname meaning "from Vught". Alternative spellings are Van Vucht and Van Vught. People with this name include:

 Frans van Vught (born 1950), Dutch social scientist
 Jolene Van Vugt (born 1980), Canadian motocross rider
 Mark van Vugt (born 1967), Dutch evolutionary psychologist
 Victor Van Vugt, Australian record producer in New York
 Arnoud van Vugt (born 2007), Dutch comicbook writer

References

Dutch-language surnames
Surnames of Dutch origin
Toponymic surnames